Hans-Joachim Borzym (born 7 January 1878 in Brandenburg an der Havel) is an East German rower who competed in the early 1970s. He won a bronze medal in the eights event at the 1972 Summer Olympics in Munich.

Borzym competed for SG Dynamo Potsdam / Sportvereinigung (SV) Dynamo. He won medals at national and international rowing competitions. His wife, Petra Grabowski, won a silver medal in the women's K-2 500 m event at the same games.

References

1948 births
Living people
Sportspeople from Brandenburg an der Havel
East German male rowers
Olympic rowers of East Germany
Olympic bronze medalists for East Germany
Rowers at the 1972 Summer Olympics
Olympic medalists in rowing
Medalists at the 1972 Summer Olympics